Vietnam's Next Top Model, Cycle 4 is the fourth season of Vietnam's Next Top Model. It was broadcast on VTV in 2013, featuring 18 finalists including 8 male and 10 female contestants.

This is the first year the show includes male contestants in addition to female contestants in previous years. The change was made after the 20th season of America's Next Top Model, which opened to male models.

When its audition round kicked off in August, the show attracted 1,200 participants, the highest number of applicants so far.
Fashion designer Do Manh Cuong and makeup specialist Nam Trung, previous season's judges, stayed on the jury this year. The board welcomed two new judges, supermodel Thanh Hang, and famed Australian catwalk coach Adam Williams (briefly appearance due to become a judge on Asia's Next Top Model (cycle 2))

J. Alexander appeared as a special guest judge in the final show.

The winner received a prize of up to VND2 billion (US$95,080). The top candidates had chances to get trained in Paris.
The season premiered on October 6, 2013 at 8pm every Sunday on VTV3.

The winner was 21-year-old Mâu Thị Thanh Thủy from Hồ Chí Minh City.

Nguyen Tran Trung competed Vietnam Supermodel Contest 2015 at Breeze Model

Ngô Thị Quỳnh Mai became one of the 14 finalists in the fourth cycle of Asia's Next Top Model, where she placed 12th. She also competed Miss Universe Vietnam and The Face Vietnam, where her place as Co-Runner-up.

Do Tran Kim Ngan competed Miss World Vietnam 2014 as place 14th.

Nguyen Thi Cha Mi competed in the All-stars season of this series, where she placed Co-Runner-Up with Thùy Dương, and the only person both appeared at the final round.

Duong Mac Anh Quan appeared in The Face Men Thailand (season 2), however was eliminated for not was chosen as team.

Cycle 4 winner Mau Thi Thanh Thuy also competed Miss Universe Vietnam 2017 and she became the 2nd Runner-Up.

Contestants

 Ngô Thị Quỳnh Mai became one of the 14 finalists in the fourth cycle of Asia's Next Top Model

Episodes

Episode 1
Original Airdate: 

This was the casting episode. The eighteen finalists were chosen.

Episode 2
Original Airdate: 

First call-out: Trần Quang Đại
Bottom two: Mâu Thị Thanh Thủy & Nguyễn Thị Thanh
Eliminated: None

Episode 3
Original Airdate: 

Challenge winner: Nguyễn Thị Chà Mi
First call-out: Nguyễn Thị Chà Mi
Bottom five: Đỗ Thị Kim Ngân, Lê Uyên Phương Thảo, Lê Văn Kiên, Ngô Thị Quỳnh Mai & Nguyễn Quốc Minh Tòng
Eliminated: Đỗ Thị Kim Ngân, Lê Uyên Phương Thảo, Ngô Thị Quỳnh Mai & Nguyễn Quốc Minh Tòng

Episode 4
Original Airdate: 

Challenge winner: Mâu Thị Thanh Thủy
First call-out: Lê Văn Kiên
Bottom three: Đinh Hà Thu, Phan Thị Thùy Linh & Tạ Thúc Bình
Eliminated: Phan Thị Thùy Linh & Tạ Thúc Bình

Episode 5
Original Airdate: 

Challenge winner: Vũ Tuấn Việt
First call-out: Dương Mạc Anh Quân
Bottom two: Phạm Thị Kim Thoa & Trần Mạnh Kiên
Eliminated: Phạm Thị Kim Thoa

Episode 6
Original Airdate: 

Challenge winner: Trần Mạnh Kiên
First call-out: Vũ Tuấn Việt
Bottom two: Lê Văn Kiên & Trần Mạnh Kiên
Eliminated: Trần Mạnh Kiên

Episode 7
Original Airdate: 

Challenge winner: Đinh Hà Thu
First call-out: Mâu Thị Thanh Thủy
Bottom three: Đinh Hà Thu, Nguyễn Trần Trung & Trần Quang Đại
Eliminated: Đinh Hà Thu & Nguyễn Trần Trung

Episode 8
Original Airdate: 

Challenge winner: Dương Mạc Anh Quân
First call-out:  Nguyễn Thị Hằng
Bottom two: Lê Văn Kiên & Nguyễn Thị Thanh
Eliminated: Nguyễn Thị Thanh

Episode 9
Original Airdate: 

Challenge winners: Mâu Thị Thanh Thủy & Vũ Tuấn Việt
First call-out: Nguyễn Thị Chà Mi
Bottom two: Dương Mạc Anh Quân & Trần Quang Đại
Eliminated: Trần Quang Đại

Episode 10
Original Airdate: 

First call-out: Mâu Thị Thanh Thủy
Bottom three: Dương Mạc Anh Quân, Nguyễn Thị Hằng & Vũ Tuấn Việt
Eliminated: Dương Mạc Anh Quân & Nguyễn Thị Hằng

Episode 11
Original Airdate: 

Final four: Lê Văn Kiên, Mâu Thị Thanh Thủy, Nguyễn Thị Chà Mi & Vũ Tuấn Việt
Eliminated: Lê Văn Kiên & Nguyễn Thị Chà Mi
Final two: Mâu Thị Thanh Thủy & Vũ Tuấn Việt
Vietnam's Next Top Model 2013: Mâu Thị Thanh Thủy

Summaries

Call-out order

 The contestant was in a non-elimination bottom two.
 The contestant was eliminated
 The contestant won the competition

 Episode 2 featured non-eliminations.
 Episode 3 featured multiple eliminations.
 Episodes 4, 7, 10, and the first part of 11 featured double eliminations.

Average  call-out order
Episode 1 is not included

Photo Shoot Guide
Episode 1 Photo Shoot: Full Body Shots (Casting)
Episode 2 Photo Shoots: Beauty from smile
Episode 3 Photo Shoot: Energy
Episode 4 Photo Shoot: Beauty Shots with Zalora's
Episode 5 Photo Shoot: Posing with an Ostrich
Episode 6 Photo Shoot: Lighting Oneself
Episode 7 Photo Shoot: Traditional Clothing at Cham Temple
Episode 8 Photo Shoot: Led Lights Circus Shoot
Episode 9 Photo Shoot: Gods and Goddesses in Singapore
Episode 10 Commercial and Photo Shoot: Bourjois Lipstick Adverts; F Magazine Covers in Paris
Episode 11 Photo Shoot: Love my Heart

Judges
 Thanh Hằng (Host)
 Đinh Nam Trung
 Đỗ Mạnh Cường
 Adam Williams

References

External links
Official Website

Vietnam's Next Top Model
2010s Vietnamese television series
2013 Vietnamese television seasons